Pedro Miguel Amorim Pereira Silva (born 31 August 1988), known as Tiba, is a Portuguese professional footballer who plays for Gil Vicente F.C. as an attacking midfielder.

Club career
Born in Arcos de Valdevez, Viana do Castelo, Tiba played until the age of 25 in the Portuguese third division or lower. He represented during this timeframe C.A. Valdevez, S.C. Valenciano, A.D. Os Limianos and F.C. Tirsense. His professional debut was made, however, in the Greek second tier with Kastoria FC, for which he appeared from February to June 2008.

Tiba signed with Vitória F.C. in the Primeira Liga in summer 2013. He played his first game in the competition on 25 August, coming on as a second-half substitute in a 2–0 away loss against Rio Ave FC. He totalled 30 official appearances in his only season at the Estádio do Bonfim, scoring a late equaliser for a 1–1 home draw with S.C. Braga on 21 April 2014.

On 3 July 2014, Tiba joined Braga on a one-year contract for €500,000. He missed only two games in his debut campaign, one being for his dismissal for handball on 24 April 2015 after scoring in a 1–1 home draw against C.F. Os Belenenses. Previously, on 7 January, against the same opposition, he concluded a 7–1 win in the quarter-finals of the Taça de Portugal, but was an unused substitute in the final loss to Sporting CP.

On 31 August 2015, Tiba and teammate Erick Moreno were loaned to Spanish Segunda División club Real Valladolid in a season-long move. Subsequently, he spent the better part of the following two campaigns on loan at G.D. Chaves back in his homeland.

Tiba signed a three-year deal with Lech Poznań on 2 July 2018. He made his debut ten days later, against FC Gandzasar Kapan in the UEFA Europa League first qualifying round. His maiden appearance in the Polish Ekstraklasa took place on the 22nd, and he scored in a 2–1 away victory over Wisła Płock.

In August 2020, Tiba agreed to an extension until 2022 with a one-year option. He won his first honour with the 2021–22 national championship, contributing 25 matches and two goals to the feat.

Tiba returned to Portugal on 24 June 2022, aged nearly 34, on a two-year contract at Gil Vicente F.C. to replace Pedrinho who signed for a team in Turkey.

International career
Tiba never played for Portugal at any youth level. In late August 2014, he was selected by full side manager Paulo Bento for a UEFA Euro 2016 qualifier against Albania to be played the following month in Aveiro, but did not take to the field in the 0–1 defeat.

Career statistics

Honours
Lech Poznań
Ekstraklasa: 2021–22

References

External links

Portuguese League profile 

1988 births
Living people
People from Arcos de Valdevez
Sportspeople from Viana do Castelo District
Portuguese footballers
Association football midfielders
Primeira Liga players
Segunda Divisão players
F.C. Tirsense players
Vitória F.C. players
S.C. Braga players
G.D. Chaves players
Gil Vicente F.C. players
Football League (Greece) players
Kastoria F.C. players
Segunda División players
Real Valladolid players
Ekstraklasa players
II liga players
Lech Poznań players
Lech Poznań II players
Portuguese expatriate footballers
Expatriate footballers in Greece
Expatriate footballers in Spain
Expatriate footballers in Poland
Portuguese expatriate sportspeople in Greece
Portuguese expatriate sportspeople in Spain
Portuguese expatriate sportspeople in Poland